PK-36 Mansehra-IV is a constituency for the Khyber Pakhtunkhwa Assembly of the Khyber Pakhtunkhwa province of Pakistan.

See also
 PK-35 Mansehra-III
 PK-37 Mansehra-V

References

External links 
 Khyber Pakhtunkhwa Assembly's official website
 Election Commission of Pakistan's official website
 Awaztoday.com Search Result
 Election Commission Pakistan Search Result

Khyber Pakhtunkhwa Assembly constituencies